Anything That Moves was a literary, journalistic, and topical magazine published in the United States from 1990 to 2001. The magazine's mission was to confront and redefine concepts of sexuality and gender, to defy stereotypes and broad definitions of bisexuals, and to combat biphobia.

Title 
The complete title of the magazine, Anything That Moves: Beyond the Myths of Bisexuality, was purposely chosen for its controversial nature. The title refers to the stereotype depicting bisexuals as willing to have sex with "anything that moves" and was suggested by Tom Geller, author of the book Bisexuality: A Reader & Sourcebook. In its opening statement, the magazine stated its intent to reclaim the negative stereotype about bisexual people in order to highlight the need "to create movement" related to bisexual issues.

History 
Anything That Moves was published by the Bay Area Bisexual Network (BABN) for the entirety of its run. It was founded by Karla Rossi as an expansion of the 12 page Bay Area Bisexual Network Newsletter. The first issue of the magazine was published in 1991. In her first editorial, Rossi stated that she was motivated to start Anything That Moves in order to combat misconceptions about bisexuals and address issues related to bisexual erasure and oppression in heterosexual, gay, and lesbian communities. She specifically highlighted the impact of the AIDS crisis on bisexuals.

Rossi was managing editor of Anything That Moves until 1993. The managing editor position was briefly held by Gerard Palmeri and by Tori Woodard for a special issue on Spirituality and Healing until it was passed to Mark Silver in 1994. Silver held the position of managing editor until issue #16 of the magazine. In 1998, Linda Howard took over editing under the title "editrix" and held this position for the rest of the magazine's run.

The final issue of Anything That Moves was released in 2001. Overall, BABN published 22 issues of the magazine, along with one special Pride edition published in 1999.

In 2020, a team of archivists scanned every issue of Anything that Moves and uploaded them online.

References

Bisexual culture in the United States
Bisexuality-related magazines
Defunct magazines published in the United States
LGBT-related magazines published in the United States
Magazines established in 1990
Magazines disestablished in 2002
Magazines published in San Francisco